Heinrich Leopold Wagner (19 February 1747 – 4 March 1779) was a German dramatist.

Wagner was born in Strasbourg and is chiefly known for his 1776 tragedy The Child Murderess.  He died, aged 32, in Frankfurt.

Works
 Prometheus, Deukalion und seine Rezensenten, 1775
 Der wohltätige Unbekannte, 1775
 Die Reue nach der Tat, 1775
 Neuer Versuch über die Schauspielkunst, 1776, a translation of Louis-Sébastien Mercier's Du Théâtre ou nouvel essai sur l'art dramatique
 Leben und Tod Sebastian Silligs
 Die Kindermörderin, 1776
 Briefe, die Seylersche Gesellschaft betreffend, 1777
 Evchen Humbrecht oder Ihr Mütter merkts Euch!, 1778, a reworking of Die Kindermörderin

1747 births
1779 deaths
Writers from Strasbourg
Alsatian-German people
German male dramatists and playwrights
18th-century German dramatists and playwrights
French writers in German
18th-century French male writers